Eleonora Giuditta Pandini (born 8 February 1960 in Milan) is an Italian former swimmer who competed  in two events at the 1976 Summer Olympics.

References

1960 births
Living people
Swimmers from Milan
Italian female swimmers
Italian female freestyle swimmers
Olympic swimmers of Italy
Swimmers at the 1976 Summer Olympics
Mediterranean Games gold medalists for Italy
Swimmers at the 1975 Mediterranean Games
Mediterranean Games medalists in swimming
Swimmers at the 1979 Mediterranean Games
20th-century Italian women